Tsunemasa is a masculine Japanese given name.

Possible writings
Tsunemasa can be written using different combinations of kanji characters. Here are some examples: 

常正, "usual, righteous"
常政, "usual, politics"
常昌, "usual, clear"
常将, "usual, commander"
常雅, "usual, elegant"
常真, "usual, reality"
恒正, "always, righteous"
恒政, "always, politics"
恒昌, "always, clear"
恒将, "always, commander"
恒雅, "always, elegant"
恒真, "always, reality"
庸正, "common, righteous"
庸政, "common, politics"
庸昌, "common, clear"
庸将, "common, commander"
毎正, "every, righteous"
毎政, "every, politics"
毎昌, "every, clear"
毎将, "every, commander"

The name can also be written in hiragana つねまさ or katakana ツネマサ.

Notable people with the name
Tsunemasa Iwasaki (岩崎 常正, 1786–1842), Japanese botanist, zoologist, and entomologist.
Tsunemasa Kawamata (川又 常正, birth and death dates unknown), eighteenth-century Japanese artist.
Tsunemasa Kikkawa (吉川 経幹, 1829–1867), Japanese samurai. 12th lord of the Iwakuni territory of Suo Province.

Given names
Japanese masculine given names